Gharibabad (also Romanized as Gharībābād) is a village in Bajgan Rural District, Aseminun District, Manujan County, Kerman Province, Iran. At the 2006 census, its population was 325, in 85 families.

References 

Populated places in Manujan County